Prince Stepan Khilkoff (14 (25) December 1785 – 10 (22) October 1854 in St. Petersburg) was the eldest son of Prince Alexander Jacobovich Khilkoff.   He had a distinguished military career, with his portrait in the hall of heroes in the Military Gallery of the Winter Palace.

Military career
As a Lieutenant General, he fought in the bloody battle of Austerlitz, and at Gutstadt, Heilsberg and Friedland; in the latter battle he was badly wounded in his right side.

His detachment was attacked by the enemy at the village of Burtsova on 15 September, Prince Khilkov turned the rear of the French infantry battalion, attacked and crushed it. He, in turn, was then attacked in the flank by two French squadrons of dragoon guards, but repulsed them with an equally powerful charge. General Dorokhov thanked Prince Khilkov for his success and sent him to demand the enemy's surrender. He was met by rifle fire. Dorokhov ordered another attack, sending Prince Khilkov to cut off the French retreat. K threw half of his squadrons into the attack, but was hit by a bullet in the right of his groin and was carried off the battlefield unconscious.

He took  part in the battles of Lutzen and Bautzen, the offensive from Silesia to Dresden, the battle of Dresden and in the famous two-day-long battle of Kulm on 17 and 18 August; on the 17th he was again hit by a bullet, in his right arm, but he did not leave the field.

On 8 March, Prince Khilkov exchanged shots with Napoleon's guard, but avoided an unequal battle and withdrew. On the 10th he followed the enemy army along the Vitry road; having reached the village of Sompuy, he harassed the French rearguard with rifle fire for two days before returning to his regiment. 

Prince Khilkov's participation in the 1814 war had a conclusion at the battle of La Fere Champenois, at which the Tsarevich chose the Household Dragoons to take the enemy guns. Prince Khilkov's two squadrons were the first to attack, but were attacked themselves in the centre of the French line of battle by three squadrons of French cuirassiers. Khilkov turned his men to face the enemy, fell to hard hand-to-hand fighting and overran the cuirassiers. In this battle he was wounded by a pistol bullet in his right hand, fell from his horse and nearly paid for success with his life.

On 22 August 1826, the day of Emperor Nikolay Pavlovich's coronation, he was promoted to Lieutenant-General; on 5 July 1827 he was awarded the order of St Vladimir 2nd Class, and on 6 December 1830 the order of St Anna 1st Class with an Imperial crown, having received over the previous ten years, 22 signs of the monarch's favour.

On 15 September 1834 Prince Khilkov was awarded the diamond insignia of the order of St Alexander Nevsky having distinguishing himself in the main events of all the Emperor Alexander's wars with Napoleon and the Polish rebellion.

References

1786 births
1854 deaths
Russian commanders of the Napoleonic Wars
Stepan